Simon Augustinus Ericsson (27 November 1886 – 28 May 1966) was a Swedish rower who competed in the 1912 Summer Olympics. He was a crew member of the Swedish boat "Göteborgs" that was eliminated in the first round of the men's eight tournament.

References

1886 births
1966 deaths
Swedish male rowers
Olympic rowers of Sweden
Rowers at the 1912 Summer Olympics
People from Lidköping Municipality
Sportspeople from Västra Götaland County